The Home Court is an American sitcom that aired from September 30, 1995, to June 22, 1996, on NBC. The series starred Pamela Reed as a judge and mother who tried to juggle her home and professional lives.

The Home Court was a production of Paramount Network Television.

Premise
Sydney J. Solomon is a family-court judge who is also a divorced mother of four,  19-year-old Mike, 16-year-old Neal, 13-year-old Marshall, and 11-year-old Ellis.

Cast
Pamela Reed as Sydney J. Solomon
Breckin Meyer as Mike Solomon
Meghann Haldeman as Neal Solomon
Robert Gorman as Marshall Solomon
Phillip Van Dyke as Ellis Solomon
Charles Rocket as Gil Fitzpatrick
Meagen Fay as Greer

Episodes

References

External links

1995 American television series debuts
1996 American television series endings
1990s American sitcoms
English-language television shows
NBC original programming
Television shows set in Chicago
Television series by CBS Studios